Kim Seon-Hwa (born 7 January 1991) is a South Korean handball player for SK Sugar Gliders and the South Korean national team.

She participated at the 2011 World Women's Handball Championship in Brazil.

References

1991 births
Living people
South Korean female handball players
Handball players at the 2014 Asian Games
Handball players at the 2018 Asian Games
Asian Games gold medalists for South Korea
Asian Games medalists in handball
Medalists at the 2014 Asian Games
Medalists at the 2018 Asian Games
Handball players from Seoul